Jam Mir Mohammad Yousaf Aliani (Urdu: جام مير محمد یوسف عالياني; February 14, 1954 – February 3, 2013) was the 12th Jam of Lasbela, (Urdu: والي رياست لسبيله) and a former Chief Minister of Balochistan province of Pakistan.

Background and family
Mir Jam Mohammad Yousaf was born in 1954 at Lasbela, Balochistan. He belonged to the Koreja Family of Samma Tribe who ruled over Sindh.

Political career

Yousaf served as the Chief Minister of Balochistan province from 2002 to 2007. He was the Minister for Water and Power, Railways and a Minister in Balochistan assembly. Previously he held positions as MNA and MPA in the National and Balochistan Provincial Assembly. He was the Provincial President of PML (Q) from 2002.

Nawab Bugti Murder Case 
On 7 October 2009, a single bench of the Balochistan High Court (BHC) comprising Chief Justice Qazi Faez Essa accepted an application of Nawabzada Jamil Akbar Bugti, the eldest son of former Balochistan Governor and Chief Minister Nawab Akbar Bugti, alleging that Yousaf, along with former President Pervez Musharraf and former prime minister Shaukat Aziz, was responsible for the killing of his father on 26 August 2006, in a military operation.

BHC ordered the sub-house officer of Dera Bugti to register a first investigation report against Yousaf. On 9 January 2010, the Supreme Court of Pakistan rejected Yousaf's plea against the BHC orders to file a case against him in the Nawab Bugti murder case.

In 2012, Jamil Bugti formally nominated Yousaf in his police report alleging that the former chief minister was responsible for his father's killing. On 17 July 2012, the BHC granted Yousaf interim bail in the case.

Death
Jam Mohammad Yousaf died of cardiac arrest on 3 February 2013 in Islamabad, and was buried in Bara Bagh Cemetery, Lasbela.

See also
 Jam Ghulam Qadir Khan

References

External links
The Daily Dawn
Jam Mohammad Yousaf Profile
"We will talk to MMA leaders to withdraw some portfolios so that more MPAs from the PML(Q) can be brought in" Jam Mohammad Yousaf Aliani, Chief Minister, Balochistan

1954 births
2013 deaths
Pakistan Muslim League (Q) politicians
Chief Ministers of Balochistan, Pakistan
Jamote people
Nawabs of Balochistan, Pakistan
People from Lasbela District
Nawabs of Pakistan
Princely rulers of Pakistan
Balochistan MPAs 2002–2007
St. Patrick's High School, Karachi alumni
Tumandars